Valérie Beauvais (born 8 March 1963) is a French politician of The Republicans (LR) who represented Marne's 1st constituency in the National Assembly from the 2017 election until 2022.

Political career 
Beauvis succeeded Arnaud Robinet at the 2017 election.

On 21 November 2018, Beauvis was appointed as Shadow Family Minister by Laurent Wauquiez.

She lost her seat in the first round of the 2022 French legislative election.

References 

Living people
1963 births
People from Marne (department)
People from Nevers
People from Nièvre
The Republicans (France) politicians
Deputies of the 15th National Assembly of the French Fifth Republic
21st-century French women politicians
Women members of the National Assembly (France)
Members of Parliament for Marne